The Centro Cultural Gabriela Mistral (GAM) (formerly known as the Diego Portales Building) is a cultural center located on 227 Av. Libertador Bernardo O'Higgins, in Santiago de Chile. The complex was originally built to serve as the headquarters for the third UNCTAD conference, which was held in Santiago in 1972, and consisted of a convention center and an adjoining 22-stories building. The building was finished in only 275 days in a significant effort supported by several thousand volunteers. This effort was part of a major propaganda initiative performed by the socialist government of Salvador Allende, in power between the end of 1970 and September 1973 .After the conference, the building was used as a cultural center until the 1973 Chilean coup d'état. After the end of the Pinochet regime, it hosted a number of conventions and the adjacent tower became the main building for the Ministry of National Defense. In early 2006, a fire destroyed parts of the building, which led the government of Michelle Bachelet to rethink the original sense of the building and return it into a cultural center, open to the public. Adapting the structure of its urban environment, the building takes on the concept of transparency and many artworks from the original design. The second phase that contains an auditorium with space for more than 2000 is going to start soon.

The Centro Cultural Gabriela Mistral was inaugurated in September 2010 and is named after Chilean poet-diplomat, educator and humanist Gabriela Mistral.  Today it's a cultural centre devoted to disseminate and promote performing arts and music. Among many other activities, it offers contemporary drama and dance, as well as classic and popular music, a space to continuous development and experimentation. Furthermore, with an emphasis on contemporary photography and popular arts, the GAM houses a range for visual arts. Due to its high demands for transparency, variety and quality, it is orientated to generate direct encounters between artists and diverse audiences.

References 

Buildings and structures in Santiago
Cultural centers
Tourist attractions in Santiago, Chile
Modernist architecture in Chile